Milice, film noir is a French documentary film from 1997. It was directed and written by Alain Ferrari, starring Emile Augonnet, Francoise Basch, and Michel Bouquet.

Synopsis 
The documentary film about French militia, active under the Vichy regime in occupied France, during World War II. Interviews with former militia men and their victims. It demonstrates that the militia's ruthless persecution of Jews and resistance movements exceeded even the Gestapo's requirements.

Cast 
 Emile Augonnet: herself
 Francoise Basch: himself
 Michel Bouquet: narrator 
 Jean Cantaloup: himself
 Philippe Darnand: himself
 Jacques Delperlle de Bayac: himself
 Alain Ferrari: himself
 Jean Marais: himself

See also 
 Chantons sous l'Occupation

References

External links 
 
 Milice, film noir (1997) at Films de France
 Movie - Milice, film noir | Ampere Mcfadden

1997 films
French documentary films
1990s French-language films
1997 documentary films
Documentary films about Vichy France
1990s French films